Anna Risi (1839 – 1900), nicknamed Nanna, was a popular Italian art model. She was a muse and mistress of German painter Anselm Feuerbach, who admired her beauty so much that he painted her at least twenty times.

Biography
Risi was married to a cobbler and lived in Trastevere, a village neighborhood in Rome with a history as working class. Her striking features caught the eye of various artists who came to the city for inspiration, and she modeled for a number of paintings and sculptures in her early 20s. But it wasn't until Frederic Leighton, who would become the President of the Royal Academy in London, that her face became known to the world. Leighton's series of paintings of Risi caught the eye of the Prince of Wales and other notables, canonizing her forever.

From there, Risi became the obsession of Anselm Feuerbach, who painted dozens of paintings of his muse and lover. By then, Risi had left her family and was living with the artist. Feuerbach and his family did much to improve Risi's circumstances and style, but the artist was irritable and suffered from syphilis. Risi ran off with a "rich Englishman"...only to return to Feuerbach and beg forgiveness. He had a new muse, however, so he rejected her.

“Yesterday her predecessor accosted me in greatly reduced circumstances,” he wrote, “But I merely waved to her from a distance."

Today, Feuerbach's works of Risi are housed in Wiesbaden, Germany.

Gallery

See also
 1203 Nanna
 List of people from Rome
 List of Italian women artists

References

External links

 ANNA RISI, LA ROMAINE TRANSTÉVERINE, 1859 bust of Risi by Jean-Baptiste Clésinger

Italian female models
1839 births
1900 deaths
19th-century Italian women